Pedro Miguel Castro Brandão Costa (born 21 November 1981 in Arouca, Aveiro) is a Portuguese retired footballer who played mainly as a right back.

Club career
A product of Boavista FC's youth system that still appeared with modest Gondomar S.C. and F.C. Famalicão in his early years as a senior, Costa joined Primeira Liga club S.C. Braga in the 2002–03 campaign. He made his first-team debut on 26 April 2003, featuring the full 90 minutes in a 1–3 home loss against S.L. Benfica.

After only 37 league appearances for Braga in five seasons combined – he was also regularly played by the reserves in the third division during his stint – Costa moved to Associação Académica de Coimbra for the 2007–08 season. Again mainly used as a backup with the Students, he appeared on both sides of the defensive sector when called upon, playing in a career-best with the professionals 22 games in his second year, as the team finished in seventh position.

In June 2011, after having appeared in 11 league matches during the season (13 overall), 30-year-old Costa left Académica and signed for F.C. Arouca in the second level, where he started playing football as a youngster.

References

External links

1981 births
Living people
Portuguese footballers
Association football defenders
Primeira Liga players
Liga Portugal 2 players
Segunda Divisão players
Boavista F.C. players
Gondomar S.C. players
F.C. Famalicão players
S.C. Braga B players
S.C. Braga players
Associação Académica de Coimbra – O.A.F. players
F.C. Arouca players
Portugal youth international footballers
Sportspeople from Aveiro District